Yugoslav Second League (Serbo-Croatian: Druga savezna liga / Друга савезна лига, Slovenian: Druga zvezna liga, Macedonian: Втора сојузна лига) was the second tier football league of SFR Yugoslavia. The top clubs were promoted to the top tier, the Yugoslav First League.

The Yugoslav Second League existed from 1946 to 1991. Although the Yugoslav First League had existed since 1923, the Second League was only introduced in 1945.

League format

Over the years, the league changed its format many times:
In 1946–47 each of the six Yugoslav federal republics had its own league (SR Bosnia and Herzegovina, SR Croatia, SR Macedonia, SR Montenegro, SR Serbia and SR Slovenia)
In 1947–48 the leagues were merged into a single national "Unified League" (Jedinstvena liga)
In 1952 each of the republics played its own second-level "Republic League" again (Republička liga)
In 1952–53 a number of "Inter-republic Leagues" were played (Međurepubličke lige)
In 1953-54 a single "Unified League" was played again
In 1955–56 the league was split into four regional groups called "zones" (zone, singular zona) with a total of 5 groups marked by roman numerals, called Zone I, Zone II-A, Zone II-B, Zone III, and Zone IV (I. Zona, II. A Zona, II. B Zona, III. Zona, IV. Zona)
In 1958–59 this was reduced to only two regional divisions covering the entire country, named East and West (Istok and Zapad)
In 1968–69 they were replaced by four regional divisions: East, West, North and South (Istok, Zapad, Sever/Sjever, and Jug)
In 1973–74 the system returned to two regional groups, named East and West (Istok and Zapad)
In 1988–89 these were merged into a single national "Unified League" again, which was played in this format for three seasons until 1990–91 and the breakup of Yugoslavia

In total:
9 seasons were played as a single national league (1947–51, 1953–55, and 1988–91)
25 seasons had two regional divisions (1958–68, and 1973–88)

Seasons

See also 

 Yugoslav First League
 Yugoslav Third League
 Slovenian Republic League

External sources 
  All-time Yugoslav Second League (1947–1992) at RSSSF.

References 

 
2
Sports leagues established in 1946
1946 establishments in Yugoslavia
Recurring events disestablished in 1991
Yugoslavia
1991 disestablishments in Yugoslavia